The General Staff of the Army of Republika Srpska was the highest professional and staff organ for preparation and use of the Army of Republika Srpska in war and in peace.

Main Staff (1992–1995) 
After the outbreak of the Bosnian War, the Army of Republika Srpska was founded on 12 May 1992 with Ratko Mladić as its commander. Since the command and units of the Yugoslav People's Army withdrew from Bosnia and Herzegovina on 20 May; that brigades of the Territorial Defence of Republika Srpska with few or none professional military cadres were just formed; that Bosnian War was already in full motion; and that war zone was flooded with volunteer units out of control, the creation of an unified military command unfolded in exceptionally difficult circumstances.

The core of new General Staff was formed by Bosnian Serb officers of the 9th Knin Corps and the 2nd Army District of the Yugoslav People's Army. The General Staff was composed of the Command and staff units.

Command 
The head of the Main Staff and the Command was General Ratko Mladić. The Command was divided in five independent sectors, staff and administration:

 Staff for operational-educative affairs – Major general Manojlo Milovanović (simultaneously deputy commander of the Main Staff)
 Sector for mobilization and administrative-personal affairs – Colonel Mićo Grubor
 Sector for morale, religious and legal affairs – Major general Milan Gvero
 Sector for intelligence and security affairs – Colonel Zdravko Tolimir
 Sector for the Air Force and Air Defence – Colonel Jovo Marić
 Administration for development and finance – Colonel Stevan Tomić
 Sector for rear services – Major general Đorđe Đukić

Closest advisors of commander of the Main Staff and people charged with the most responsible tasks were: Đorđe Đukić (logistics, spare parts, etc.), Manojlo Milovanović (planning, creating operational plans, leading operations on the field, etc.), Zdravko Tolimir (intelligence affairs) and Milan Gvero (political affairs of the Main Staff, especially relations with civilian authorities of the Republika Srpska and international observers).

Staff units 
 Training Center "Rajko Balać"
 Center for informational-propaganda activity
 65th Defensive Motorized Regiment
 67th Communications Regiment
 40th Engineering Regiment
 1st Guards Motorized Brigade of the Main Staff
 89th Rocket-Artillery Brigade
 1st Serb Mixed Brigade (temporary composition)
 2nd Serb Mixed Brigade (temporary composition)
 3rd Serb Mixed Brigade (temporary composition)
 14th Serb Brigade (temporary composition)
 10th Diversant Unit
 10th Intelligence Center
 14th Rear Base
 27th Rear Base
 30th Rear Base
 35th Rear Base
 63rd Automobile Battalion
 Military Hospital of the Main Staff
 Military Medical Center of the Army
 Aviation Institute "Eagle"
 Repair Institute "Cosmos"
 Rear Company of Vrbas barracks

Main Staff in war 
The principal task of the Main Staff was planning the strategy for the conduct of the war, and cooperation with civilian authorities in order to secure the necessary resources. Very often, the Main Staff would conduct military operations via front command posts. In the first year of the war, almost whole attention of the Main Staff was directed towards the formation of military brigades out of the Territorial Defence units and volunteers. The Command of the Main Staff often came into clashed with civilian authorities, partly because of different perception of political repercussions of military operations on world public opinion (political leadership of Republika Srpska was, naturally, more sensitive on international pressures), and partly because of interweaving of responsibilities, especially about material and financial supply of the Army. According to opinion of some experts who studied the course of the Bosnian War, the Command of the Main Staff of the Army of Republika Srpska proved to be the most capable military leadership among the participants in the war:

List of chiefs

See also 
 Army of Republika Srpska
 Ministry of Defence (Republika Srpska)

References

Bibliography 
 Balkan Battlegrounds: A Military History of the Yugoslav Conflict, 1990–1995 Volume I and II. Central Intelligence Agency, Office of Russian and European Analysis.
 Bulatović, Ljiljana: Raport Komandantu. Beograd : Udruženje pisaca Poeta : Lj. Bulatović, 2010

Military of Republika Srpska
Organizations based in Republika Srpska
Republika Srpska
1992 establishments in Bosnia and Herzegovina
2005 disestablishments in Bosnia and Herzegovina